Sichuan Changhong Electric Co., Ltd., doing business as Changhong domestically and CHiQ internationally, is a Chinese consumer electronics company based in Mianyang, Sichuan, founded in October 1958. It is the second-largest manufacturer of televisions in China. In 2004, 90 percent of the television sets exported from China to the United States were made by Changhong.

History 
Changhong emerged from the Changhong Machinery Factory, which was a state-owned large enterprise established in the 1950s. The company, which was part of the 156 key projects that were aided by the Soviet Union, focused on the development and production of airborne fire control radar system. By mid-1970s, Changhong began manufacturing products for civilian use when demand for military hardware declined, eventually focusing on the television product line. During the next decade, it beefed up its technological capabilities with a series of partnerships with overseas companies such as Panasonic, from which it imported tubes and advanced production lines to drive the volume production of television. In 1980, the company already boasted the production of over 10,000 television units annually and by 1988, this number rose to almost a million units. In 1994, the company was listed as a publicly traded company and, a year later, it was recognized as China's largest television manufacturer.

Changhong has a minimal presence in North America, where it sells TVs through the online retailer Newegg. It markets its brand CHIQ in United States.

Another line of products is the manufacturing of nickel–iron batteries. Changhong is the sole manufacturer of batteries for the Chengdu J-10.

Since 2004, Changhong's development strategy and operating mechanism system have changed from time to time, and the industrial scale has expanded rapidly, becoming the leading enterprise in the domestic intelligent integration industry layout. It owns four listed companies including Sichuan Changhong, Changhong Meiling, Changhong Huayi and Changhong Jiahua.

In 2008, an offer was reportedly made by AMD for a 15% stake but was blocked by the Chinese government.

Leadership

References

External links
 Official website

Companies based in Sichuan
Electronics companies established in 1958
1958 establishments in China
Display technology companies
Electronics companies of China
Chinese brands
1994 initial public offerings